Hendrik Jacobus "Hentie" Martens  (born 29 October 1971) is a South African former rugby union player.

Playing career
Martens represented  at the 1990 Craven Week tournament for schoolboys and was selected for the South African Schools team in 1990. In 1995 he joined , playing provincial rugby and super rugby for the Coastal Sharks. At the end of the 1993 season, he toured with the Springboks to Argentina. Martens did not play in any test matches but played in three tour matches, scoring one try for the Springboks.

See also
List of South Africa national rugby union players – Springbok no. 598
List of South Africa national under-18 rugby union team players

References

1971 births
Living people
South African rugby union players
South Africa international rugby union players
Free State Cheetahs players
Sharks (Currie Cup) players
Alumni of Hilton College (South Africa)
Rugby union players from Pietermaritzburg
Rugby union scrum-halves